Marina Escobar Martínez (born 2 February 1977) is a Spanish former professional tennis player.

Biography
Escobar, who had a best singles ranking of 325, was most prominent as a doubles player, winning five ITF titles in the late 1990s. She reached a career high doubles ranking of 140 and took part in the qualifying draw for the 1998 Wimbledon Championships.

Her best performance on the WTA Tour came at the 1998 Madrid Open, where she partnered with Mariam Ramón Climent to make the doubles semi-finals.

In 2001, while attending the University of Málaga, she represented Spain at the Summer Universiade, held in Beijing.

ITF finals

Singles: 1 (0–1)

Doubles: 12 (5–7)

References

External links
 
 

1977 births
Living people
Spanish female tennis players
University of Málaga alumni